Hudson Boat Works is a rowing racing shell manufacturer based in London, Ontario. Jack Coughlan and his brother-in-law Hugh Hudson founded the company in 1981. In March 2007, Hudson began production of their "Shark" line of boats.  Designed by Britt Chance, US Naval Architect, Luis Tarrataca, Hudson Design Engineer, and Jack Coughlan, Head of Hudson R&D, the Great White 1x and the Hammerhead 8+ shells and claim to be; faster than ever, more stable, and more comfortable for the rowers. Hudson is the official boat manufacturer for the Canadian and American National Teams. 

Hudson Boat Works boats have won 86 World and Olympic Medals since 1984.

Hudson formerly held the world best time for the men's heavyweight eight for a two thousand meter race which was 5:19.85, designed by Luis Tarrataca, set by the U.S in the 2004 Olympic games in Athens, Greece. The current best time of 5:18.68 was set by the German men's eight in a boat made by German boatmaker Empacher.

External links
 https://www.theglobeandmail.com/sports/olympics/canadian-mens-eight-rowing-team-sets-world-record/article4209846/
 https://www.cbc.ca/sports/2.720/canadian-men-s-8-rowers-break-world-record-1.1185565
 Hudson Boat Works official website

Rowing equipment manufacturers
Sporting goods manufacturers of Canada
Companies based in London, Ontario
Vehicle manufacturing companies established in 1981
1981 establishments in Ontario
Canadian brands